Tarnawa Górna  is a village in the administrative district of Gmina Zembrzyce, within Sucha County, Lesser Poland Voivodeship, in southern Poland.

The village was established by Vlachs in the 17th century and was initially known as Rzedz or Rec.

References

Villages in Sucha County